ROKS Andong (PCC-771) was a  of the Republic of Korea Navy.

Development and design 

The Pohang class is a series of corvettes built by different Korean shipbuilding companies. The class consists of 24 ships and some after decommissioning were sold or given to other countries. There are five different types of designs in the class from Flight II to Flight VI.

Construction and career 
Andong was launched on 30 April 1987 by Hanjin Heavy Industries in Busan. The vessel was commissioned on 7 November 1988 and decommissioned on 31 December 2020.

Potential Transfer 
Philippine Navy representatives examined the decommissioned Pohang-class corvette ROKS Andong (PCC-771) at the Jinhae naval base in South Korea in November 2021. It was found to be in “good operating condition.”

If the transfer pushes through, the vessel will be the Philippines’ second donated ship by South Korea, which two years ago handed over a second-hand Pohang-class corvette ROKS Chungju (PCC-762), now called BRP Conrado Yap (PS-39).

References
 

Ships built by Hanjin Heavy Industries
Pohang-class corvettes
1987 ships